Jacinta Patrice Stapleton (born 6 June 1979) is an Australian actress. Known for her role as Amy Greenwood in the Australian television soap opera Neighbours from 1997 to 2000 and again from 2020 to 2022. Her most notable role was playing an undercover detective in the primetime network television series Stingers. Her performance garnered an Australian Film Institute nomination for Best Supporting Actress in a Television Drama. She is the sister of Blindspot actor Sullivan Stapleton.

Career 
Joining an acting agency at the age of six years old, along with her brother Sullivan Stapleton, she appeared in TV commercials, film and TV series. Jacinta studied drama, theatre and dance at Sandringham Secondary College before appearing in her first long running television series as Amy Greenwood in Neighbours from 1997 to 2000, making a cameo return in 2005 during the 20th anniversary of the series. In November 2020 it was announced that Stapleton would be reprising the role of Amy for a guest stint.

From 2002 to 2004 she played Christina Dichiera in the TV drama Stingers, for which she was nominated for an Australian Film Institute award for Best Supporting Actress in a Television Drama.

She also appeared in hit dramas MDA, Blue Heelers, All Saints, Dirt Game, Out of the Blue and Packed to the Rafters.

In October 1999 she posed nude for Black+White magazine.

She played Reen Nalli in the INXS: Never Tear Us Apart biopic, Mercedes Corby in the story of Schapelle and Madonna in the Molly Meldrum biopic Molly. She was won an award for her role as Bambi Steele in the film Musclecar.

She studied under the tutelage of acting coach Ivana Chubbuck.

Filmography

Film

Television

References

External links

 
 Jacinta Stapleton - Zimbio
 Jacinta Stapleton's own site
 Jacinta Stapleton's voice agent

1979 births
Living people
Actresses from Melbourne
Australian soap opera actresses
Australian child actresses
21st-century Australian actresses
20th-century Australian actresses